Evi Mittermaier (born 16 February 1953 in Munich) is a German former alpine skier who competed in the 1976 Winter Olympics and 1980 Winter Olympics. She won two World Cup races and attained 7 podiums.

Biography
She is the younger sister of double Olympic Champion, World Champion and World Cup winning alpine skier Rosi Mittermaier, sister in law of slalom specialist Christian Neureuther and aunt of world gold medalist Felix Neureuther. According to David Coleman who was commentating her sister Rosi's entry in the 1976 Winter Olympics in Innsbruck, she used to live in a hotel.

Career
Evi was a speed specialist and won two World Cup downhill races, one on 16. December 1975 in Cortina d’Ampezzo and one on 18. January 1978 in Bad Gastein. She also had finished seven times on the podium.

Music career
The sisters recorded two albums of Bavarian folk music together.

References

External links
 
 

1953 births
Living people
Olympic alpine skiers of West Germany
Alpine skiers at the 1976 Winter Olympics
Alpine skiers at the 1980 Winter Olympics
Skiers from Munich
German female alpine skiers
20th-century German women